El Ghassiroun Mosque was a Tunisian mosque in the Medina of Tunis.
It does not exist anymore.

History
The mosque was built during the Hafsid Era.

Localization
It was located in El Ghassiroun Street.

References

Mosques in Tunis